The men's triple jump event  at the 1989 IAAF World Indoor Championships was held at the Budapest Sportcsarnok in Budapest on 3 and 4 March.



Medallists

Results

Qualification
Qualification: 16.60 (Q) or at least 12 best performers (q) qualified for the final.

Final

References

Triple jump
Triple jump at the World Athletics Indoor Championships
1989 in men's athletics